Craig McRae (born 22 September 1973) is a former Australian rules footballer and the current senior coach of the Collingwood Football Club.

Playing career

Glenelg Football Club
Originally from South Australian National Football League club Glenelg. 

McRae played for Glenelg Football Club in the SANFL from 1993 until 1994, for a total of 41 games and kicked	59 goals.

Brisbane Bears
Originally from South Australian National Football League club Glenelg, McRae was drafted by AFL club Brisbane Bears as the 22nd pick in the 1994 draft and had an immediate impact, kicking two goals in his first game in 1995, and played every game of that year. McRae was renowned for his ability to kick goals from not only beyond the fifty metre line, but also for his scouting of the ball spilled from the hands of taller players.

McRae played for Brisbane Bears from 1995 until 1996 for total of 39 games and kicked a total of 56 goals.

Brisbane Lions
At the end of the 1996 season, Brisbane Bears merged with Fitzroy Lions resulting in the formation of the Brisbane Lions, McRae was then one of the players from the Bears to join the newly formed Brisbane Lions. McRae then became known for his determination and fierce tackling skills. The respected small forward/goalsneak retired from professional football after the 2004 Grand Final loss to Port Adelaide.

McRae played for Brisbane Lions from 1997 until 2004 for a total of 156 games and a total of 176 goals.  McRae was also part of Brisbane Lions' 2001, 2002 and 2003 premiership sides.

Coaching career

Richmond Football Club assistant coach (2007-2009)
In 2007, McRae served as assistant coach in the role of Player Development Coach with the Richmond Football Club under senior coach Terry Wallace. Midway through the 2009 AFL season, McRae took up the head coaching position at Richmond's VFL affiliate club Coburg, when their former coach and fellow Richmond AFL assistant Jade Rawlings was appointed caretaker senior coach at Richmond, after Wallace resigned in the middle of the 2009 AFL season after Round 11, 2009.

Brisbane Lions assistant coach (2010)
In 2010, McRae took up an assistant coaching position in the role of development coach position at the Brisbane Lions, returning to his old playing club under senior coach and former teammate Michael Voss.

Collingwood Football Club assistant coach (2011-2016) 
McRae joined  as an assistant coach in the role as head of development in 2011 under senior coach Mick Malthouse and then under senior coach Nathan Buckley from 2012. He remained at the club for five seasons.

Richmond Football Club assistant coach (2017-2020) 
He returned to Richmond at the end of the 2016 season, serving as an assistant coach under senior coach Damien Hardwick and head coach of the club's reserves side in the VFL. He took the side to a losing grand final in 2017, before winning a premiership in 2019 in the same year he won the VFL's coach of the year award and  the AFL coaches' association's assistant coach of the year award.

Hawthorn Football Club assistant coach (2021)
In 2021, McRae joined the Hawthorn Football Club as an assistant coach in the role of forward line coach under senior coach Alastair Clarkson.

Collingwood Football Club senior coach (2022–present)
In September 2021, McRae returned to the Collingwood Football Club, when he was appointed as senior coach ahead of the 2022 AFL season. McRae replaced caretaker senior coach Robert Harvey, who replaced Nathan Buckley, after Buckley stepped down in the middle of the 2021 season. In just his first season as senior coach, he led Collingwood to success, winning 16 games and finishing the 2022 season in 4th place, after they finished 17th the previous season. Out of their wins, 10 were by less than two goals. In the finals series, Collingwood reached the preliminary finals, where they lost to Sydney by one point after trailing by 23 points at the beginning of the last quarter.

Statistics

Playing statistics

|-
| 1995 ||  || 4
| 23 || 28 || 22 || 231 || 113 || 344 || 47 || 38 || 1.2 || 1.0 || 10.0 || 4.9 || 15.0 || 2.0 || 1.7 || 1
|-
| 1996 ||  || 4
| 16 || 28 || 19 || 181 || 49 || 230 || 38 || 18 || 1.8 || 1.2 || 11.3 || 3.1 || 14.4 || 2.4 || 1.1 || 1
|-
| 1997 ||  || 4
| 18 || 19 || 16 || 172 || 70 || 242 || 42 || 27 || 1.1 || 0.9 || 9.6 || 3.9 || 13.4 || 2.3 || 1.5 || 2
|-
| 1998 ||  || 4
| 16 || 13 || 15 || 150 || 79 || 229 || 48 || 17 || 0.8 || 0.9 || 9.4 || 4.9 || 14.3 || 3.0 || 1.1 || 0
|-
| 1999 ||  || 4
| 24 || 41 || 32 || 267 || 73 || 340 || 69 || 37 || 1.7 || 1.3 || 11.1 || 3.0 || 14.2 || 2.9 || 1.5 || 3
|-
| 2000 ||  || 4
| 16 || 9 || 11 || 164 || 69 || 233 || 48 || 28 || 0.6 || 0.7 || 10.3 || 4.3 || 14.6 || 3.0 || 1.8 || 2
|-
| scope=row bgcolor=F0E68C | 2001# ||  || 4
| 19 || 21 || 20 || 145 || 64 || 209 || 52 || 28 || 1.1 || 1.1 || 7.6 || 3.4 || 11.0 || 2.7 || 1.5 || 0
|-
| scope=row bgcolor=F0E68C | 2002# ||  || 4
| 24 || 29 || 27 || 193 || 108 || 301 || 61 || 66 || 1.2 || 1.1 || 8.0 || 4.5 || 12.5 || 2.5 || 2.8 || 1
|-
| scope=row bgcolor=F0E68C | 2003# ||  || 4
| 20 || 26 || 17 || 132 || 79 || 211 || 34 || 62 || 1.3 || 0.9 || 6.6 || 4.0 || 10.6 || 1.7 || 3.1 || 0
|-
| 2004 ||  || 4
| 19 || 18 || 17 || 124 || 58 || 182 || 38 || 41 || 0.9 || 0.9 || 6.5 || 3.1 || 9.6 || 2.0 || 2.2 || 1
|- class=sortbottom
! colspan=3 | Career
! 195 !! 232 !! 196 !! 1759 !! 762 !! 2521 !! 477 !! 362 !! 1.2 !! 1.0 !! 9.0 !! 3.9 !! 12.9 !! 2.4 !! 1.9 !! 11
|}

Coaching statistics
Updated to the end of the 2022 season.

|-
| 2022 || 
| 25 || 17 || 8 || 0 || 68.0% || 4 || 18
|- class="sortbottom"
! colspan=2| Career totals
! 25 !! 17 !! 8 !! 0 !! 68.0% !! colspan=2|
|}

Honours and achievements

Playing honours 
Team
 3× AFL premiership player: 2001, 2002, 2003

Individual
 SA state-of-origin representative: 1999
 International Rules representative for Aus v Ireland: 1999

Coaching honours 
Team
 VFL premiership coach (Richmond VFL): 2019

Individual
 AFLCA Assistant Coach of the Year: 2019
 VFL Coach of the Year: 2019
 AFLCA Development Coach of the Year: 2012
 AFL Senior Coach of the Year: 2022

Other work
Prior to his appointment as Collingwood Football Club senior coach, McRae was a part-time kicking and catching coach with the Melbourne Storm.

Until the end of the 2006 season, McRae was involved in a sports administration business and various football broadcasting roles including radio station Triple M, where he hosted a football programme with former Brisbane teammate Jason Akermanis.

References

External links 

1973 births
Brisbane Bears players
Brisbane Lions players
Brisbane Lions Premiership players
Collingwood Football Club coaches
Living people
People from Queensland
Glenelg Football Club players
South Australian State of Origin players
Australian rules footballers from South Australia
Coburg Football Club coaches
Christies Beach Football Club players
Hackham Football Club players
Australia international rules football team players
Three-time VFL/AFL Premiership players